Elsten Creole Torres, (born February 10, 1965) in Havana, Cuba as Listoriel Leyva Torres, is a singer songwriter and producer. He has been nominated for two Grammy Awards for his first solo independent album, Individual.

Life and career

Early life
Elsten Torres (originally Listoriel Leyva Torres) was born in Havana, Cuba during the height of the Cuban Revolution.

Mistaken Identity and Rebelde Sin Causa 
His first real serious band was called, “Mistaken Identity” then followed by his first Latin rock band, “Rebelde Sin Causa”. Elsten recorded his first professional album, Ataque with his music partner, Leonardo "Jason X" Perez, on Mexican rock label, Discos Gas.

Fulano De Tal 
In Miami, Elsten first records with the independent label, “Radio Vox” under the artistic name of Fulano de Tal.

The first single was the Cuban protest anthem, Revolucion. With the success of Revolucion, Elsten put the band together that would become “Fulano De Tal.”

The original members were; drummer – Brendan Buckley, guitarist - Julian Adam Zimmon, and bassist – Leo Nobre. Nobre left the band right before the band was to record their major label debut, Normal through BMG/RCA, and was replaced by bassist – John M. Falcone. Fulano de Tal released two full-length albums, Normal (BMG/RCA), and Etc. (Radio Vox/DLN.) The band officially broke up in 2001.

After the breakup of the band, Elsten has continued both his own career as a solo artist and has had success writing for other artists such as: Ricky Martin, Luis Fonsi, Obie Bermúdez, Alejandra Guzmán, Julio Iglesias Jr. Aleks Syntek, Oscar de Leon, Marshall Crenshaw, John Rich (Big & Rich).

Solo career 
In 2006, Elsten released his first solo album, the Grammy-nominated independent album, “Individual.”

Discography
The Elsten Torres discography is as follows: 
 “Ataque” (Rebelde Sin Causa) – Discos Gas/Mexico - 1992
 “Revolucion” (Fulano De Tal) – Maxi – single – Radio Vox Records -1995
 “Normal” – (Fulano De Tal) – BMG/RCA - 1997
 “Etc.” – (Fulano) – Radio Vox/DLN - 2000
 “Individual” – (Fulano/Elsten Torres) – FM Records -2006
 “If You Say So” – (Elsten Torres) – Uno Entertainment – 2008
 "Waiting for Clouds"= (Elsten Torres)- Real Artificial Music-2013

Compilations
 Latin Laugh Festival – BMG/RCA – 1998
 Tributo to the Cure – WEA Latina – 1999
 Una Decada de Rock – BMG - 2000

Most Notable songs
Some of the notable songs are: 
 Los Demas (top ten Billboard hit with Julio Iglesias jr.)
 Cristina Maria (Hit single from the album, “Normal”)
 No Soy Gringo (Hit single from the album, “Normal”)
 Caramelo (Hit single for Alejandra Guzman)
 Dejala Que Baile (Hit song for Michael Stuart)
 Todo El Año (Billboard #1 song with Obie Bermudez)
 Por Una Mujer (Billboard top 20 song for Luis Fonsi)
 Olvidare (hit single and video from the album, “Individual”)
 Selfish (Hit single from the album, “Normal”)
 Normal (Hit single from the album, “Normal”)
 Dando Vueltas (hit single and video from the album, “Individual”)
 Como Ayer (song for Jimena Anger for her grammy nominated album Día Azul)
 Closer Tonight (features on Huawei smartphones as default music))

References

External links
 Elsten Official Site

1965 births
Living people
American singer-songwriters
American entertainers of Cuban descent